Nicole G. Leier is a Canadian actress who resides in Los Angeles, California, United States. She is best known for her role as Kelsey in the TV series Edgemont, as well as her role in the horror film Septic Man. In 2016, Leier starred in the short film Black Chicks alongside David Cubitt. The film was written and directed by Neil LaBute. Nicole also produces and directs films with her production company "Black Tree Pictures".

She has also hosted the health and fitness webseries "Kiss My Incoming Abs" which was nominated as 'Best Reality Webseries' at the Vancouver 2015 Web Fest.

Filmography

References

External links

Canadian television actresses
Living people
Year of birth missing (living people)